Statistics of Japan Soccer League for the 1978 season.

First Division
By winning the 1978 Emperor's Cup and 1978 Japan Soccer League Cup along with the title, Mitsubishi completed the first Japanese treble ever.

Promotion/relegation Series

Nissan promoted, Fujitsu relegated.

Second Division

Promotion/relegation Series

Yamaha promoted, Kyoto Shiko relegated.

References
Japan - List of final tables (RSSSF)

1978
1
Jap
Jap